An electro-optical targeting system (EOTS), is a system employed to track and locate targets in aerial warfare. It can use charge-coupled device TV cameras, laser rangefinders and laser designators.

See also 
Forward looking infrared
Infra-red search and track
AN/AAQ-40 E/O Targeting System

References

External links
http://www.lockheedmartin.com/us/products/F-35LightningIIEOTS.html
https://medium.com/war-is-boring/6b8ebf775795

Targeting (warfare)
Film and video technology
Military electronics